Radnor station is a SEPTA rapid transit station in Radnor, Pennsylvania. It is in Radnor Township.

It serves the Norristown High Speed Line (Route 100) and is located on King of Prussia Road. All trains stop at Radnor. The station is located near the Paoli/Thorndale Line Radnor station, and is close to Radnor High School and Archbishop John Carroll High School. Trains running northwest of this station cross under the Keystone Corridor (Philadelphia to Harrisburg Main Line) that carries the Paoli/Thorndale Line as well as Amtrak's Pennsylvanian and Keystone Service trains. The station has off-street parking available.

Station layout

SEPTA Suburban bus connections

References

External links

SEPTA Norristown High Speed Line stations
Radnor Township, Delaware County, Pennsylvania